Lakin Township is a township in Kearny County, Kansas, USA.  As of the 2000 census, its population was 2,587.

Geography
Lakin Township covers an area of 63.26 square miles (163.85 square kilometers); of this, 0.02 square miles (0.06 square kilometers) or 0.04 percent is water. The stream of Sand Creek runs through this township.

Cities and towns
 Lakin (the county seat)

Adjacent townships
 East Hibbard Township (north)
 Deerfield Township (east)
 Southside Township (southeast)
 Kendall Township (southwest)
 Hartland Township (west)
 West Hibbard Township (northwest)

Cemeteries
The township contains one cemetery, Lakin.

Major highways
 U.S. Route 50
 K-25

Airports and landing strips
 Lakin Landing Field

References
 U.S. Board on Geographic Names (GNIS)
 United States Census Bureau cartographic boundary files

External links
 US-Counties.com
 City-Data.com

Townships in Kearny County, Kansas
Townships in Kansas